Propalene or bicyclo[1.1.0]buta-1,3-diene is a polycyclic hydrocarbon composed of two fused cyclopropene rings. Computational studies indicate that the molecule is planar, with the carbon framework forming a parallelogram that has distinctly alternating short and long carbon–carbon bonds.

See also 
Butadiene
Cyclobutadiene
Bicyclobutane
Butalene
Pentalene
Heptalene
Octalene

References

Polycyclic nonaromatic hydrocarbons
Bicyclic compounds
Cyclopropenes